This is a list of Panjabi films of 1976.

List of films

Indian Punjabi films

Pakistani Punjabi films

External links 
 Punjabi films at the Internet Movie Database

1976
Punjabi